Wenstrom or Wenström is a surname. Notable people with the surname include:

Frank A. Wenstrom (1903–1997), American politician
Harold Wenstrom (1893–1944), American cinematographer
Jonas Wenström (1855–1893), Swedish engineer and inventor
Matt Wenstrom (born 1970), American basketball player